Obereopsis atrosternalis is a species of beetle in the family Cerambycidae. It was described by Stephan von Breuning in 1956. It is known from Nepal and Myanmar.

References

atrosternalis
Beetles described in 1956